
Those United States, subtitled Impressions of a First Visit, is a book about Arnold Bennett's first journey (via a transatlantic steam ship) to the United States. Bennett was in the US from October to November 1911.

Those United States was serialized in Harper's Magazine from April to November 1912. It was published in book form as Your United States by Harper in November 1912. Martin Secker published Those United States in the UK in October 1912.  illustrated it.

References

Sources

Further reading

External links
Your United States at Project Gutenberg
 

American travel books
Books about the United States
Books by Arnold Bennett
Harper & Brothers books
Martin Secker books
1912 books